Marilyn Tucker Quayle (born July 29, 1949) is an American lawyer and novelist. She is the wife of the 44th vice president of the United States, Dan Quayle, and served as the second lady of the United States from 1989 until 1993.

Early life and education
Marilyn Tucker was born in the Meridian-Kessler area of Indianapolis, Indiana, to Mary Alice (née Craig, d. 1975) and Warren Samuel Tucker (d. 2004). The fourth of six children, she has three sisters (Nancy, Sally, and Janet) and two brothers (James and William). Her parents were both doctors. Her maternal grandfather was born in Maybole, Scotland. She had a strict Christian upbringing. The Tuckers were longtime admirers of Colonel Robert B. Thieme, Jr., the founder and former pastor of Berachah Church in Houston. Years later, when media attention focused on her family's religious beliefs, Marilyn Quayle said in an NBC interview: "I grew up with my mother listening to (Thieme's) tapes. ... I have never listened to him on social issues. I didn't even know that he espoused any." She does defend his biblical teachings.

She attended Broad Ripple High School and subsequently received a bachelor's degree in political science from Purdue University.  While attending college, she served as a pompom girl and as treasurer of her freshman class. She later attended law school at night and earned a J.D. at Indiana University Robert H. McKinney School of Law. There, she met Dan Quayle, the son of a newspaper publisher. The two were assigned to work together on a draft version of Indiana's death penalty law. A courtship quickly developed, and they were married by their law school dean just a few weeks later, on November 18, 1972. In 1974, they both passed the bar exam; she had given birth to their first child just a few days before the exam.

Career

Marilyn and Dan moved back to Huntington, Indiana and opened a joint law practice, Quayle and Quayle. She did most of the legal work; he worked for his father's newspaper and prepared to enter politics. In 1976, he was elected to Congress as a Republican, whereupon they suspended their law practice. In 1980, he was elected to the Senate. 

In 1988, Dan was elected Vice President on George H. W. Bush's ticket. Throughout her husband's political career, Marilyn was "always her husband's closest and most candid advisor." She campaigned independently during the presidential campaign. During the 1988 campaign, she was often portrayed in the press as smart, cold, and tough – the power behind her husband. But as second lady, she played a mostly traditional role as hostess, while being an active and involved mother to their three young children. She also worked for causes such as early diagnosis of breast cancer (her mother died of breast cancer at the age of 56). With her sister Nancy, she also published a novel, Embrace the Serpent, a thriller about the wife of a vice president.

During the 1992 presidential campaign, Marilyn was an active campaigner, delivering a speech at the Republican National Convention and spending more than 40 days on the campaign trail. In her speeches, she took a strong "family values" theme, and she was very popular with conservatives. Ultimately, Bush and Quayle lost reelection that year, and the Quayles returned to Huntington, where she joined an Indianapolis law firm. The couple later moved to Arizona, where the former Vice President had spent much of his formative years.

In 1996, Quayle narrated an advertisement for Indiana gubernatorial candidate Stephen Goldsmith. In 2010, she narrated an advertisement for Georgia gubernatorial candidate Karen Handel.

In 2011, she was reported to have phoned Arizona governor Jan Brewer about an Arizona redistricting plan that was detrimental to her son, Congressman Benjamin Quayle.

Personal life
The Quayles live in Paradise Valley, Arizona. They have three children: two sons, Tucker, founder of an investment company called Tynwald Capital, and Benjamin, who served as a member of the United States House of Representatives from Arizona's 3rd Congressional District from 2011 to 2013; and a daughter, Corinne.

Books
 Embrace The Serpent (1992)
 The Campaign: A Novel (1996)
 Moments that Matter (1999)

References

External links

|-

1949 births
20th-century American novelists
20th-century American women writers
American people of Scottish descent
American thriller writers
American women lawyers
American women novelists
Dan Quayle
Indiana lawyers
Indiana Republicans
Indiana University Robert H. McKinney School of Law alumni
Living people
People from Paradise Valley, Arizona
Pulliam family
Quayle family
Purdue University alumni
Second ladies of the United States
Novelists from Arizona
Women thriller writers
Writers from Indianapolis
Novelists from Indiana
Arizona Republicans